Adrian Mihai Iencsi (born 15 March 1975) is a Romanian football manager and a former player who is the manager of Sighetu Marmației. As a footballer, he enjoyed spells at Ceahlăul Piatra Neamţ, Rapid București, Spartak Moscow, Apollon Limassol and Kapfenberger SV. Iencsi has won two Romanian championship titles with Rapid București in 1999 and 2003.

In 2009 Adrian Iencsi signed a contract with Rapid București as a second coach and player. On 18 April 2009 the former assistant coach managed the team on a temporary basis until a replacement to Rada was found.

He ended his career at FCM Târgu Mureș. His first head coach job was at Liga IV team CS Corbeanca. Then he signed after some weeks with her rival ACS Popesti Leordeni. He finished second in the championship. After ACS Popesti Leordeni, Mister Iencsi signed for FC Voluntari, a team who play now in Liga 2 and won promotion. In the end was sacked even if he was a very professional coach.

Now, he is assistant coach at Apollon Limassol, helping Ioan Andone, a very experienced coach, who played with CFR Cluj in Champions League.

In Romania, he is well known for his love for Rapid Bucharest.

Iencsi is a very organized coach, with charisma and self-confidence, one of the top students of PRO License course organized by Romanian Football Federation.

Out of the pitch he is known that his mentor is Turkey manager, Mircea Lucescu.

Honours

Club

Rapid București 
 Romanian League Championship: 1998–99, 2002–03
 Romanian Cup: 1997–98, 2001–02
 Romanian Super Cup: 2003

References

External links
 
 
 
 

1975 births
Living people
Sportspeople from Piatra Neamț
Romanian footballers
Association football defenders
Romania international footballers
Romania under-21 international footballers
CSM Ceahlăul Piatra Neamț players
FC Rapid București players
FC Spartak Moscow players
Apollon Limassol FC players
Kapfenberger SV players
CS Concordia Chiajna players
ASA 2013 Târgu Mureș players
Romanian expatriate footballers
Expatriate footballers in Russia
Romanian expatriate sportspeople in Russia
Expatriate footballers in Austria
Romanian expatriate sportspeople in Austria
Expatriate footballers in Cyprus
Romanian expatriate sportspeople in Cyprus
Liga I players
Liga II players
Russian Premier League players
Austrian Football Bundesliga players
Cypriot First Division players
Romanian football managers
FC Voluntari managers
FC Dunărea Călărași managers
CS Pandurii Târgu Jiu managers
FC Rapid București managers
FC Rapid București assistant managers